The Other Side of Paradise is a 1992 miniseries about a doctor who goes to the Cook Islands.

Cast
 Jason Connery as Chris Masters
 Josephine Byrnes as Paula Reid
 Richard Wilson as Doc Reid
 Vivien Tan as Aleena
 Hywel Bennett as Purvis
 Jay Laga'aia as Mana
 Terence Bayler as Colonel Fawcett
 Judy Morris as Miss Sowerby
 Garry McDonald as Johnson

References

External links
 

1990s Australian television miniseries
1992 Australian television series debuts
1992 Australian television series endings
English-language television shows
ITV television dramas
Television series by Fremantle (company)
Television series by ITV Studios
Television series by South Pacific Pictures